In Greek mythology, Eiresione or Iresione  (Greek: Εἰρεσιώνη, from εἶρος - eiros, "wool") was the personification of an object very important in many Greek rituals and ceremonies: a branch of olive or laurel, covered with wool, fruits, cakes and olive flasks, dedicated to Apollo and carried about by singing boys during the festivals of Pyanopsia and Thargelia, and afterwards hung up at the house door. It could only be carried by children who had two living parents. The song they were singing during the ritual was also known as "eiresione":

Greek:

Eiresione signified the advent of wealth (Greek: πλοῦτος - ploutos).

References

A Greek-English Lexicon compiled by H. G. Liddell and R. Scott. 10th edition with a revised supplement. – Clarendon Press, Oxford, 1996; under εἰρεσιώνη.

Personifications in Greek mythology
Greek goddesses